Paradrillia is a genus of sea snails, marine gastropod mollusks in the family Horaiclavidae.

Species
Species within the genus Paradrillia include:
 Paradrillia agalma (Smith E. A., 1906)
 Paradrillia alluaudi (Dautzenberg, 1932)
 Paradrillia consimilis (Smith E. A., 1879)
 Paradrillia convexiuscula T. Shuto, 1961
 Paradrillia dainichiensis (Yokoyama, 1923)
 Paradrillia darnleyensis Shuto, 1983
 Paradrillia felix (Kuroda, Habe & Oyama, 1971)
 Paradrillia fugata (E.A. Smith, 1895)
 Paradrillia gemmata Shuto, 1983
 Paradrillia himea Makiyama, 1927
 Paradrillia inconstans (Smith E. A., 1875)
 Paradrillia kakegawensis Makiyama, 1927
 Paradrillia lithoria (Melvill & Standen, 1903)
 Paradrillia melvilli Powell, 1969
 Paradrillia minoensis Shuto, 1961
 Paradrillia nannodes (Sturany, 1900) (synonym: Pleurotoma (Surcula) nannodes Sturany, 1900) 
 Paradrillia nivalioides (Yokoyama, M., 1920)
 Paradrillia patruelis (Smith E. A., 1875)
 Paradrillia rougeyroni (Souverbie, 1874)
 Paradrillia sagamiana Okutani, 1964
 Paradrillia sultana (Thiele, 1925)
 Paradrillia taiwanensis Nomura, 1935
Species brought into synonymy
 Paradrillia (Paradrillia) coxi (Angas, 1867): synonym of Vexitomina coxi (Angas, 1867)
 Paradrillia agnewi Tenison-Woods, 1879: synonym of Vexitomina coxi (Angas, 1867)
 Paradrillia asamusiensis Nomura & Zinbo, 1940: synonym of Paradrillia inconstans (Smith, 1875)
 Paradrillia celebensis (Schepman, M.M., 1913): synonym of Benthomangelia celebensis (Schepman, 1913)
 Paradrillia dainitiensis Makiyama, 1922: synonym of Paradrillia consimilis (Smith, 1879)
 Paradrillia gaylordae Preston, 1905: synonym of Paradrillia inconstans prunulum (Melvill & Standen, 1901)
 Paradrillia pilazona Laseron, 1954 : synonym of Vexitomina torquata Laseron, 1954
 Paradrillia reticulata Kuroda, 1953: synonym of Iwaoa reticulata Kuroda, 1953

References

 Smith, E.A. 1875. A list of the Gasteropoda collected in Japanese seas by Commander H.C. St. John, R.N. Annals and Magazine of Natural History 4 15: 414-427
 Melvill, J.C. & Standen, R. 1901. The Mollusca of the Persian Gulf, Gulf of Oman, and the Arabian Sea, as evidenced mainly through the collections of Mr. F.W. Townsend, 1893-1900; with descriptions of new species. Proceedings of the Zoological Society of London 1901(ii): 327-460 pls
 Preston, H.B. 1905. Descriptions of new species of marine shells from Ceylon. Journal of Malacology 12(1): 1-8
 Makiyama, 1940 [the Journal of the Geological Society of Japan, 47: 133 
 Habe, T. 1961. Coloured illustrations of shells of Japan. Osaka, Japan : Hoikusha 82 pp., 66 pls.
 Powell, A.W.B. 1969. The family Turridae in the Indo-Pacific. Part. 2. The subfamily Turriculinae. Indo-Pacific Mollusca 2(10): 207-415, pls 188-324
 Shuto, T. 1983. New turrid taxa from the Australian waters. Memoirs of the Faculty of Sciences of Kyushu University, Series D, Geology 25: 1-26
 Taylor, J.D., Kantor, Y.I. & Sysoev, A.V. 1993. Foregut anatomy, feeding mechanisms, relationships and classification of the Conoidea (=Toxoglossa) (Gastropoda). Bulletin of the British Museum (Natural History) Zoology 59: 125-170

External links
 Worldwide Mollusca Species Data Base: Horaiclavidae
 Japan Paleobiology Database: Paradrillia

 
Horaiclavidae
Gastropod genera